Myat Thuya Lwin (born 1994) is a Burmese model who gained popularity when he became the first Myanmar national to win the Mister Global competition in 2014.

Early life 

Myat Thuya Lwin was born in  1994 in Myanmar. He graduated with a bachelor's degree in psychology.

Career 
He represented Myanmar at the Mister Global 2014 pageant which was held in Bangkok, Thailand on March 27, 2014. By the end of the event, Myat Thuya Lwin was crowned the inaugural Mister Global 2014.

References

1994 births
Burmese male models
Living people
Male beauty pageant winners
Burmese beauty pageant winners
Mister Global winners
Mister Global contestants